NRPC  may refer to:
National Railroad Passenger Corporation, the legal company name of Amtrak
National Reconciliation and Peace Centre
Nortel Retirees and former employees Protection Canada
Northern Regional Power Committee, Ministry of Power (India)
Nauru Regional Processing Centre